The 2013 Lory Meagher Cup was a hurling competition contested by Tier 4 county sides. Warwickshire, Longford, Leitrim and Fermanagh contested the 2013 competition. Tyrone were the defending champions, having won the 2012 competition, but were unable to defend their title as they were promoted to the Nicky Rackard Cup as a result of their victory. Warwickshire won the 2013 competition.

Table

Round 1

Matches

Round 2

Matches

Round 3

Matches

Final

Statistics

Top scorers

Overall

Single game

References

External links
Lory Meagher Cup results on RTÉ

Lory Meagher Cup
Lory Meagher Cup